Horopito is a locality in the North Island of New Zealand. It lies on State Highway 4 between the village of National Park and the town of Raetihi.

Horopito was the setting for the 1981 New Zealand feature film Smash Palace. More recently (2011) there has been talk of a short film set in a caravan in Horopito. The film will be entered into the Cannes Film Festival.

In the early days Horopito was a bustling sawmilling town. It had a railway  station (1907-1986), school, two hotels, a bank, a strip club, post office and numerous houses. In 1907 a former Liberal MP, Kennedy Macdonald, had the impression that Hamilton, Horopito, Waiouru, Marton, and Palmerston North would be the chief places along the North Island Main Trunk line and was advertised as, "The future mercantile and industrial centre between Auckland and Wellington". In the 1920/30s Horopito fell into decline. People left for better work opportunities. Today nothing remains of most of the buildings. The hub of Horopito is the wreckers, Horopito Motors. The yard has been the scene of a few kiwi films like, Smash Palace and Goodbye Pork Pie.

Since 2014, the Cold Kiwi Motorcycle Rally has been held at Horopito.

References

Populated places in Manawatū-Whanganui